Ben Harris is a Democratic former member of the Missouri House of Representatives, having served from 2011 to 2019.

External links
 
Legislative website

1976 births
21st-century American politicians
Living people
Democratic Party members of the Missouri House of Representatives
People from Hillsboro, Missouri
Politicians from St. Louis